The Somerton TARDIS is a police box on Acacia Avenue beside the B4237 road (Chepstow Road) in the Somerton area of Newport, South Wales. This police box is the only remaining one of four that were in Newport. It is a Grade II listed building. Police boxes were deployed in the UK as a police telephone communications point before public and mobile phones were widely available. The Somerton police box has a lamp fixing on top which would flash to indicate an incoming call.

The first UK police boxes were deployed in 1888; the familiar 'TARDIS' shape first appeared in 1929. UK police discontinued use of such boxes by 1969.

The Somerton police box became known in Newport as the TARDIS as a reference to the television series Doctor Who, in which the Doctor's time machine appears as a police box due to its chameleon circuit being stuck. During the 1980s local residents painted a long multi-coloured scarf on the blue police box as worn by the fourth Doctor, played by actor Tom Baker 1974–1981.

The earliest UK police boxes were of wood, but the Somerton box is of concrete. Consequently, it deteriorated over the years, largely due to concrete cancer. In January 2010 a grant of £10,500 was allocated by Cadw to restore the structure as a recognition of its importance as a local landmark.

See also

References

External links 
 A famous blue police box is saved from destruction by Doctor Who fans The Times
 Wales "Tardis" given £10,000 News Wales
 Kiosk Korner Police Box page – shows a photo of the Somerton TARDIS
 Google Earth view

Buildings and structures in Newport, Wales
Grade II listed buildings in Newport, Wales
Culture in Newport, Wales
Landmarks in Newport, Wales
Doctor Who